The Hawaiian–Emperor seamount chain is a series of volcanoes and seamounts extending about  across the Pacific Ocean.

The chain was produced by the movement of the ocean crust over the Hawaii hotspot, an upwelling of hot rock from the Earth's mantle.

As the oceanic crust moves the volcanoes farther away from their source of magma, their eruptions become less frequent and less powerful until they eventually cease to erupt altogether. At that point, erosion of the volcano and subsidence of the seafloor cause the volcano to gradually diminish.

As the volcano sinks and erodes, it first becomes an atoll island and then an atoll. Further subsidence causes the volcano to sink below the sea surface, becoming a seamount. Once a seamount is 600 metres or more under the surface, it is also classed as a guyot. This list documents the most significant volcanoes in the chain, ordered by distance from the hotspot, but there are many others that have yet to be properly studied.

The chain can be divided into three subsections. The first, the main windward Hawaiian islands consist of the eight youngest and easternmost Hawaiian islands. This is the youngest part of the chain and includes volcanoes with ages ranging from 400,000 years to 5.1 million years. The island of Hawaii comprises five volcanoes, of which two (Kilauea and Mauna Loa) are still active. Kamaʻehuakanaloa Seamount (formerly Lōihi) continues to grow offshore, and is the only known volcano in the chain in the submarine pre-shield stage.

The second part of the chain is composed of the Northwestern Hawaiian Islands, collectively referred to as the Leeward isles, the constituents of which are between 7.2 and 27.7 million years old. Erosion has long since overtaken volcanic activity at these islands, and most of them are atolls, atoll islands, and extinct islands. They contain many of the most northerly atolls in the world, including Kure Atoll, the northernmost atoll in the world.

The oldest and most heavily eroded part of the chain are the Emperor seamounts, which are 39 to 85 million years old.

The Emperor and Hawaiian chains are separated by a large L-shaped bend that causes the orientations of the chains to differ by about 60 degrees. This bend was long attributed to a relatively sudden change in the direction of plate motion, but research conducted in 2003 suggests that it was the movement of the hotspot itself that caused the bend. The issue is still currently under debate.

All of the volcanoes in this part of the chain have long since subsided below sea level, becoming seamounts and guyots (see also the seamount and guyot stages of Hawaiian volcanism). Many of the volcanoes are named after former emperors of Japan. The seamount chain extends to the West Pacific, and terminates at the Kuril–Kamchatka Trench, a subduction zone at the border of Russia.

Hawaiian archipelago

Northwestern Hawaiian islands

Emperor seamounts

Notes

References

External links
This abstract contains preliminary data for several of the seamount dates; these dates are revised in the subsequent paper (as reported above):

Lists of volcanoes
Submarine volcanoes

Volcanoes of Oceania
Volcanoes of the Pacific Ocean
Cretaceous volcanoes
Cenozoic volcanoes
Hawaii geography-related lists